Pelican is a suburb of the City of Lake Macquarie in New South Wales, Australia, located  from Newcastle's central business district across the entrance to Lake Macquarie from the town of Swansea. It was known as Pelican Flat until 1991.

The Aboriginal people, in this area, the Awabakal, were the first people of this land.

The public school opened in 1938.

References

External links
 History of Pelican Flat (Lake Macquarie City Library)

Suburbs of Lake Macquarie